Emily O'Brien is a Republican member of the North Dakota House of Representatives from the 42nd district. The 42nd district is in the northern portion of Grand Forks and includes the University of North Dakota.

References

External links
 Profile at the North Dakota Legislative Assembly

21st-century American politicians
Living people
Republican Party members of the North Dakota House of Representatives
Politicians from Grand Forks, North Dakota
University of North Dakota alumni
Year of birth missing (living people)
21st-century American women politicians
Women state legislators in North Dakota